Dendrochytridium is a fungal genus in the order Chytridiales. The genus is monotypic, containing the single saprobic species Dendrochytridium crassum, isolated from detritus collected from an Australian tree canopy. Both the genus and species were described as new to science in 2013. Phylogenetically, Dendrochytridium crassum groups together in a clade with other fungi possessing Group II-type zoospores. These fungi, which include representatives from the genera Chytridium, Phlyctochytrium, Chytriomyces, and Polyphlyctis are classified in the family Chytridiaceae.

The generic name combines dendro (derived from Greek, meaning "tree"), which refers to the origin of the first collection, and Chytridium, the type genus of the order Chytridiales. The specific epithet crassum is Latin for "broad", and refers to the broad rhizoids.

References

External links

Chytridiomycota genera
Monotypic fungi genera